The Worland Ranch is a historic district that includes the farmstead established in 1900 by C.F. "Dad" Worland near his namesake town of Worland, Wyoming. The site was in fact the original townsite, with the Worland post office located on the grounds.  The present town developed just to the east on the broad flatlands east of the Bighorn River. The original townsite is commemorated by an inscribed stone marker.

"Dad" Worland's 1900 dugout was the first structure in the vicinity. In 1903 a survey established that the Worland site was a promising location for irrigation, and the ranch became the center of construction activities. By 1918 "dad" Worland and his son Charlie had built the present ranch buildings. They sold the ranch to the Wyoming Sugar Company in 1920. The ranch has been preserved through its time as a working ranch and is still operated as a ranch.

The Worland House was listed on the National Register of Historic Places in 1992.

See also
 Worland House

References

External links
 Worland Ranch at the Wyoming State Historic Preservation Office

Houses on the National Register of Historic Places in Wyoming
Houses in Washakie County, Wyoming
Ranches in Wyoming
Ranches on the National Register of Historic Places in Wyoming
Historic districts on the National Register of Historic Places in Wyoming
National Register of Historic Places in Washakie County, Wyoming
Worland, Wyoming
1900 establishments in Wyoming